Marius Paré (22 May 1903 in Montmagny, Quebec – 16 February 2002) was a Canadian clergyman and bishop for the Roman Catholic Diocese of Chicoutimi. He became ordained in 1927. He was appointed bishop in 1960. He died on 16 February 2002, at the age of 98.

References

Roman Catholic bishops of Chicoutimi
1903 births
2002 deaths
People from Montmagny, Quebec
20th-century Roman Catholic bishops in Canada